Thelyphonellus is a genus of Thelyphonid whip scorpions, first described by Reginald Innes Pocock in 1894.

Species 
, the World Uropygi Catalog accepts the following four species:

 Thelyphonellus amazonicus (Butler, 1872) – Brazil, Suriname
 Thelyphonellus ruschii Weygoldt, 1979 – Guyana
 Thelyphonellus vanegasae Giupponi & Vasconcelos, 2008 – Colombia
 Thelyphonellus venezolanus Haupt, 2009 – Venezuela

References 

Arachnid genera
Uropygi